Nu Arae (ν Arae / ν Ara) is shared by two star systems in the constellation Ara:
 ν1 Arae
 ν2 Arae
They are separated by 0.49° on the heavens. The stars are also sometimes referred to Upsilon Arae (υ1 and υ2 Arae), but more generally unlettered.

Notes 

Arae, Nu
Ara (constellation)